A lobster pick or lobster fork is a long, narrow food utensil used to extract meat from joints, legs, claws, and other small parts of a lobster.  Lobster picks are usually made of stainless steel and weigh as much as an average teaspoon. They have a long, textured cylindrical handle, ending in a crescent-shaped moderately sharp pick, or else a small two-tined fork. The other end may have a spoon for scooping out meat from inside the lobster. The lobster pick can also be used with other seafood, such as crab and crawfish.

References

Eating utensils